Luis Castillo is an Ecuadorian boxer. He competed in the men's heavyweight event at the 1980 Summer Olympics. At the 1980 Summer Olympics, he lost to Jürgen Fanghänel of East Germany.

References

Year of birth missing (living people)
Living people
Ecuadorian male boxers
Olympic boxers of Ecuador
Boxers at the 1980 Summer Olympics
Boxers at the 1979 Pan American Games
Pan American Games bronze medalists for Ecuador
Pan American Games medalists in boxing
Place of birth missing (living people)
Heavyweight boxers
Medalists at the 1979 Pan American Games
20th-century Ecuadorian people